Louse Creek is a stream in the U.S. state of South Dakota.

Louse Creek was named for the wood lice which was considered a pest by early settlers.

See also
List of rivers of South Dakota

References

Rivers of Corson County, South Dakota
Rivers of South Dakota